The Land Girls is a 1998 film directed by David Leland and starring Catherine McCormack, Rachel Weisz, Anna Friel, Steven Mackintosh and Ann Bell. It is based on the 1995 novel Land Girls by Angela Huth.

The title refers to the real-life British women who were called upon to assist rural Englanders when men left their farms to fight in the First and Second World Wars.

Plot 
During both the First and Second World Wars, the Women's Land Army was set up in the United Kingdom to recruit women to work at farms where men had left to go to war. Women in the WLA were nicknamed "land girls".

Set in 1941 in the Dorset countryside, three "land girls" arrive on a remote farm. They are an unlikely trio: hairdresser Prue is vivacious and sexy, Cambridge University graduate Ag is quiet and more reserved, and dreamy Stella is in love with Philip, a dashing Royal Navy officer. Despite the women's differences, they soon become close friends. The film follows their relationships with each other and the men in their lives in the face of war.

Cast 
Catherine McCormack as Stella
Rachel Weisz as Ag (Agapanthus)
Anna Friel as Prue (Prudence)
Steven Mackintosh as Joe Lawrence
Tom Georgeson as Mr Lawrence
Maureen O'Brien as Mrs Lawrence
Lucy Akhurst as Janet
Gerald Down as Ratty, Lawrence Farm Hand
Paul Bettany as Philip

Production 
Filming locations included the scenic Exmoor National Park, Crowcombe Heathfield station on the West Somerset Railway and Dulverton.

The film cost £6 million.

Reception
The film holds a 61% on Rotten Tomatoes based on 18 reviews.

In a review for The New York Times, Stephen Holden wrote, "The movie is ultimately more passionate about its characters' place in history than about their individual lives, which take fairly predictable if not always happy turns. In the end, all three women blend together as an idealized everywoman lightly sketched on a larger historical canvas."

Holden concluded, "The film's most evocative historical set piece shows a parade and air show at which a newly built Spitfire makes its maiden flight. The movie is unequivocal about the nobility of this moment. The shared sacrifice and hard labor have all been worth it. As the aircraft soars and dips across the rural English landscape, it is the very embodiment of a glorious winged victory soon to come."

Roger Ebert praised the cinematography in particular, stating "What I liked about the movie--what I preferred to the romances and relationships--was its look, its sensual evocation of the British countryside in winter." Peter Stack of the San Francisco Chronicle wrote, "Wistful but not precious, 'The Land Girls' takes a bit of acclimatizing, but Leland ('Wish You Were Here') makes his leisurely pacing an attribute. The film sinks into the green, serene countryside, a place where emotions echo big."

Box office 
After 11 weeks on release the film had grossed £1.3 million ($2.2 million) in the United Kingdom. It grossed $1 million internationally for a worldwide total of $3.2 million.

References

External links 

 

1998 films
1998 romantic drama films
1990s war drama films
British romantic drama films
British war drama films
Films about farmers
Films based on British novels
Films directed by David Leland
Films set in 1941
Films set on farms
Films set in Dorset
Films set on the home front during World War II
Films shot in Devon
Films shot in Somerset
Gramercy Pictures films
PolyGram Filmed Entertainment films
British World War II films
1990s female buddy films
1990s English-language films
British female buddy films
1990s British films